Chetwode is a surname, and may refer to:

 Anna Maria Chetwode (fl. 1827), Irish novelist
 George Chetwode (1877–1957), Royal Navy officer 
 Sir John Chetwode, 4th Baronet (1764–1845), British politician
 Penelope Chetwode (1910–1986), English travel writer and wife of John Betjeman
 Philip Chetwode, 1st Baron Chetwode (1869–1950), British Army officer

See also 

 Baron Chetwode
 Chetwood